Sagarmatha Television, is a Nepali television program broadcast from Kathmandu, Nepal. It is the first Nepali television broadcast from Nepal. It was established in 2007.
In United States, Sagarmatha Television is broadcast every Sunday at 12:30 PM on MHZ Networks, followed by Nepal Darshan at 1:00 PM. This program intends to keep people informed of things happening in Nepal and also to display its culture to the multinational communities in America and around the world.

External links

Nepalese television series
Television channels and stations established in 1997
2007 establishments in Nepal